"Better Best Forgotten" is a song by British pop group Steps, released on 8 March 1999. It was the final single to be taken from their debut album, Step One. The song became the group's fourth top-10 hit in the UK, peaking at number two on the UK Singles Chart, and it also reached the top 20 in Ireland and the Flanders region of Belgium.

A stripped back ballad version of the track was performed during the 2012 Christmas with Steps tour. "Better Best Forgotten" features all three girls singing a verse each (in a similar manner to Last Thing on My Mind), with the boys joining in for the choruses.

Critical reception
Can't Stop the Pop wrote that this was the song "most strikingly consistent" with the "ABBA-on-speed" vision, that Pete Waterman strove to achieve with the group. They added that Faye, Lisa and Claire "all bring such drama" to the track, "they sing as though their life depends on it, and that – among many other things – is what worked so well about Steps." Scottish newspaper Daily Record noted that the group "continue to shine in the charts with their latest Abba-esque hit", "Better Best Forgotten". They also wrote that this "catchy tune" is "sure to fill the dance floors." Sarah Davis from Dotmusic stated that "this predictably Abba-sounding track builds energetically to reach its adrenaline-filled peak in a hook-laden, singalong chorus. The group really cannot put a foot wrong at present". Gary James from Entertainment Focus noted it as a "uplifting" and "energetic" pop song, with "fairytale references of happy endings and taking chances." He added that this track is "definitely not best forgotten". Mark Beaumont from NME said it is "great". Sunday Mirror commented, "A poppy enough tune from the smiley five piece but they need some new material. And fast."

Chart performance
"Better Best Forgotten" entered the UK Singles Chart at number two in March 1999, beaten to number one by Boyzone's "When the Going Gets Tough". It spent 17 weeks on the British charts and became the first single for Steps to fall off the chart and re-enter. The song topped the UK Indie Chart while reaching number eight in Ireland. Additionally, it was a top-20 hit in Belgium and peaked at number 11 on the Eurochart Hot 100.

Music video
A music video was made to accompany the song, directed by David Amphlett. It has a watery-theme, and the group wear blue outfits. Group members Lee and H play with water pistols, and interfere with the girls' singing. During the video shoot, a glass wall collapsed on Faye.

Track listings

Credits and personnel

A-side: "Better Best Forgotten"
Credits are adapted from the liner notes of Step One.

Recording
 Recorded at PWL Studios, Manchester, in 1998
 Mixed at PWL Studios, Manchester
 Mastered at Transfermation Studios, London

Vocals
 Lead vocals – Claire Richards, Faye Tozer, Lisa Scott-Lee
 Background vocals – Lee Latchford-Evans, Ian "H" Watkins

Personnel
 Songwriting – Dan Frampton, Pete Waterman
 Production – Karl Twigg, Mark Topham, Pete Waterman
 Mixing – Dan Frampton
 Engineer – Chris McDonnell, Dan Frampton
 Drums – Chris McDonnell
 Keyboards – Karl Twigg, Mark Topham

B-side: "Why?"
Credits are adapted from the liner notes of "Better Best Forgotten".

Recording
 Recorded at PWL Studios, Manchester, in 1998
 Mixed at PWL Studios, Manchester
 Mastered at Transfermation Studios, London

Vocals
 Lead vocals – Faye Tozer
 Background vocals – Claire Richards, Lisa Scott-Lee, Lee Latchford-Evans, Ian "H" Watkins

Personnel
 Songwriting – Mark Topham, Karl Twigg
 Production – Mark Topham, Karl Twigg, Pete Waterman
 Mixing – Dan Frampton, Pete Waterman
 Engineer – Chris McDonnell

Charts and certifications

Weekly charts

Year-end charts

Certifications

References

1999 singles
1998 songs
Jive Records singles
Pete Waterman Entertainment singles
Songs written by Andrew Frampton (songwriter)
Songs written by Pete Waterman
Steps (group) songs
UK Independent Singles Chart number-one singles
Songs about heartache